The phrase "inherent bias" refers to the effect of underlying factors or assumptions that skew viewpoints of a subject under discussion.  There are multiple formal definitions of "inherent bias" which depend on the particular field of study.

In statistics, the phrase is used in relation to an inability to measure accurately and directly what one would wish to measure, meaning that indirect measurements are used which might be subject to unknown distortions.

See also

 Systemic bias and systematic bias, or cognitive bias
 Tacit assumption, paradigm shift
 Hawthorne effect

References
 In opinion polls or statistics: "OECD glossary of statistical terms - Inherent bias", OECD, April 2003, Statistical terms - Inherent bias.
 In journalism: "Audeamus — How dare we… • The Press's Inherent Bias" (by Miche), September 2007, The Press's Inherent Bias.

Sampling (statistics)
Polling terms
Bias